Hothouses (or Hot House Blooms) (1889) is a book of symbolist poetry by Belgian Nobel Laureate Maurice Maeterlinck. Most of the poems in this collection are written in octosyllabic verse, but some are in free verse.

Poems
"Serre chaude"
"Oraison (I)"
"Serre d'ennui"
"Tentations"
"Cloches de verre"
"Offrande obscure"
"Feuillage du cœur"
"Âme chaude"
"Âme"
"Lassitude"
"Chasses lasses"
"Fauves las"
"Oraison (II)"
"Heures ternes"
"Ennui"
"Hôpital"
"Oraison nocturne"
"Désirs d'hiver"
"Ronde d'ennui"
"Amen"
"Cloche à plongeur"
"Aquarium"
"Verre ardent"
"Reflets"
"Visions"
"Oraison (III)"
"Regards"
"Attente"
"Après-midi"
"Âme de serre"
"Intentions"
"Attouchements"
"Âme de nuit"

English translations
Serres chaudes has been translated into English by Richard Howard. This edition, published by Princeton University Press also contains a short prose work, The Massacre of the Innocents, inspired by a Brueghel painting of the same name, as well as illustrations by George Minne that appeared in the original volume.

Musical Adaptations
"Serre chaude," "Serre d'ennui," "Lassitude," "Fauves las," and "Oraison" were all set to music by French composer Ernest Chausson. "Feuillage du cœur" was set to music by Arnold Schoenberg under the name Herzgewächse and by the Belgian composer Serge Verstockt (original title).

References
Maeterlinck, Maurice (2003). Hothouses: Poems 1889. Trans. Richard Howard. Princeton and Oxford: Princeton University Press. , .

External links
Chapter II of Edward Thomas' Maurice Materlinck, entitled "First Poems:Serres Chaudes"

Poetry by Maurice Maeterlinck
Poetry collections
1889 poems